Matthias Shepler (November 11, 1790 – April 7, 1863) was a U.S. Representative from Ohio for one term from 1837 to 1839

Early life and career 
Born in Westmoreland County, Pennsylvania, Shepler received a limited schooling.
He served in the War of 1812.
He moved to Ohio in April 1818 and settled in Bethlehem Township, Stark County, Ohio.
He engaged in agricultural pursuits.
He was in the Justice of the Peace for thirty years.
County commissioner for two terms.
He served as member of the Ohio House of Representatives in 1829.
He served in the Ohio Senate in 1832.

Congress 
Shepler was elected as a Democrat to the Twenty-fifth Congress (March 4, 1837 – March 3, 1839).
He served as chairman of the Committee on Revisal and Unfinished Business (Twenty-fifth Congress).

Death
He declined to be a candidate for renomination in 1838.
He moved to Navarre, Ohio, in 1860, where he died April 7, 1863.
He was interred in Shepler Church Cemetery, near Navarre.

Family life 
Shepler was married three times, first in 1816. He had seven children. He was a member of the Church of the United Brethren in Christ.

References

Sources

1790 births
1863 deaths
County commissioners in Ohio
People from Westmoreland County, Pennsylvania
People from Navarre, Ohio
Democratic Party members of the Ohio House of Representatives
Democratic Party Ohio state senators
American military personnel of the War of 1812
American United Brethren in Christ
19th-century American politicians
Democratic Party members of the United States House of Representatives from Ohio